
Gmina Budzów is a rural gmina (administrative district) in Sucha County, Lesser Poland Voivodeship, in southern Poland.

Villages
Gmina Budzów contains the villages and settlements of Baczyn, Bieńkówka, Budzów, Jachówka, Palcza and Zachełmna.

Neighbouring gminas
Gmina Budzów is bordered by the gminas of Lanckorona, Maków Podhalański, Pcim, Stryszów, Sułkowice, Tokarnia and Zembrzyce.

References
Polish official population figures 2006

Budzow
Sucha County